Luigi Raimondi (25 October 1912 – 24 June 1975) was an Italian cardinal of the Roman Catholic Church. He served as Prefect of the Sacred Congregation for the Causes of Saints from 1973 until his death, and was elevated to the cardinalate in 1973.

Biography
Raimondi was born in Lussito, Acqui, to Giovanni Raimondi and his wife Maria Giacchero. He attended the seminary in Acqui before being ordained to the priesthood by Bishop Lorenzo Del Ponte on 6 June 1936. Raimondi then furthered his studies in Rome at the Pontifical Lateran University. He was summoned to the elite Pontifical Ecclesiastical Academy where he studied diplomacy. From 1938 to 1942, Raimondi was secretary of the Guatemalan nunciature, during which time he was raised to the rank of a Privy Chamberlain of His Holiness on 3 March 1939. He then served as auditor of the Apostolic Delegation to the United States until 1949. Within the internunciature to India, Raimondi was counselor and chargé d'affaires from 1949 to 1953. He was named a Domestic Prelate of His Holiness on 5 March 1951, and an official of the Vatican Secretariat of State in 1953.

On 24 December 1953, Raimondi was appointed Titular Archbishop of Tarsus and Nuncio to Haiti, and Apostolic Delegate to the British and French West Indies. He received his episcopal consecration on 31 January 1954 from Cardinal Adeodato Giovanni Piazza, OCD, with Archbishop Antonio Samoré and Bishop Giuseppe Dell'Olmo serving as co-consecrators, in the church of San Carlo al Corso. Raimondi was later named Apostolic Delegate to Mexico on 15 December 1956. He attended the Second Vatican Council from 1962 to 1965. He was made Apostolic Delegate to the United States on 30 June 1967.

Pope Paul VI created him Cardinal-Deacon of Ss. Biagio e Carlo ai Catinari in the consistory of 5 March 1973, and appointed him prefect of the Sacred Congregation for the Causes of Saints on the following 21 March. Cardinal Raimondi was once described as "a liberal who knows his limitations" and "a likable man who wants to be liked".

Raimondi died from a heart attack in Vatican City at age 62. He is buried in his family's plot in Acqui.

References

External links
Cardinals of the Holy Roman Church
Catholic-Hierarchy

20th-century Italian cardinals
People from the Province of Alessandria
Apostolic Nuncios to the United States
Participants in the Second Vatican Council
1912 births
1975 deaths
Members of the Congregation for the Causes of Saints
Cardinals created by Pope Paul VI
Pontifical Lateran University alumni
Pontifical Ecclesiastical Academy alumni